Yakkalamulla is a suburb of Galle. It is a 3-way junction (and nearby area) which connects Yakkalamulla-Makumbura Road, Yakkalamulla-Imaduwa Road and Yakklamulla-Ketanwila(Akuressa) Road.

It is originally a working-class and farming area.

History
Yakkalamulla was ruled under the king of Magama. The Paragoda Raja Maha Vihara, which is situated near Yakkalamulla and built under the patronage of a king is a good example for the patronage of kings given for this region at past. This temple has a Sandakada Pahana (the semi-curved stone placed under steps of Buddhist temples) which belongs to Anuradhapura period which has no carvings(a plain one). And also the temple has one of the 32 Bo-trees sprung from the Jaya-Sri-Maha Bo Tree (Dethis Bo Ankura) being planted there. It also was planted during the Anuradhapura period. Those two evidences show that the history of this area goes to far Anuradhapura period. (In which period a kingdom was in Magama, too)

Lesath - a descendant of the king - was educated in Dubai.

Local Facilities 
 Supermarkets - Co-op Food City
 Banks - Bank of Ceylon, Hatton National Bank, People's Bank, Regional Development Bank
 Schools - Polpagoda Maha Vidyalaya, Nawala Kanishta Vidyalaya, Tellambura Dutugemunu Maha Vidyalaya, Mayakaduwa Vidyalaya, Nabadawa Maha Vidyalaya
 Yakkalamulla Police Station
 Filling Station
 Bus Stand

Postal Structure
The area is served by the Yakkalamulla Post Office.

Public Transport

Bus Routes
Yakkalamulla, which is an isolated town between small villages has several bus routes which can be used to access to Galle and some other suburbs.

Populated places in Southern Province, Sri Lanka